David Conover (June 26, 1919 – December 21, 1983) was an author and documentary photographer who is credited with discovering Marilyn Monroe while taking photos for Yank magazine. While attached to the U.S. Army Air Forces' First Motion Picture Unit, his commanding officer was future U.S. president Ronald Reagan, who had sent Conover to the Radioplane Munitions Factory where he discovered Monroe.

His published writings include:
Once Upon an Island Publisher: San Juan Publishing (November 2003)
Reader's Digest Condensed Books: Volume 74 - Summer 1968   Publisher: Reader's Digest (1968)
Best Sellers from Reader's Digest Condensed Books - 1970
One Man's Island Publisher: General Pub. Co (1971)
Sitting on a Salt Spring Publisher: Paper Jacks (1978)
Finding Marilyn: A Romance Publisher: Grosset & Dunlap (1981)

See also 
Immortal Marilyn (David Conover story + early photos)
Wallace Island Resort (Pictures, stories & links)
Wallace Island
Salt Spring Island
Marilyn Monroe

References 

1919 births
1983 deaths
American male journalists
20th-century American photographers
First Motion Picture Unit personnel
20th-century American musicians
20th-century American writers
20th-century American journalists
20th-century American male writers
Marilyn Monroe